Fortier may refer to:

People with the surname
 Alcée Fortier, professor of language and folklore, New Orleans
 Charles Fortier, hockey player
 Chris Fortier, DJ
 Claude Fortier, physiologist
 Donald Fortier, member of U.S. intelligence community
Drew Fortier, musician, songwriter, filmmaker, author, and actor
 François-Edmond Fortier (1862–1928), French photographer
 Lisa Fortier (born 1981), American basketball coach
 Marc Fortier, Canadian hockey player
 Michael Fortier, Canadian politician
 Michael Fortier (American), accomplice in Oklahoma City bombing
 Moïse Fortier, Quebec politician
 Robert Fortier, American actor
 Sylvie Fortier (born 1958), Canadian former synchronized swimming
 Yves Fortier (geologist), former head of the Geological Survey of Canada
 Yves Fortier (lawyer), Canadian diplomat, lawyer and business executive

Toponyms
 Fortier Township, Yellow Medicine County, Minnesota, United States
 Fortier River (disambiguation)

Other uses
 Fortier (TV series), a Québécois television drama series